Nicholas Caradja (1737–1784) was a Phanariote Prince of Wallachia, who reigned between 15 January 1782 and 17 July 1783.

Early life 
He was born as the son of Prince Konstantin Caradja (d. 1771) and his wife, Zefira Soutzos (d. 1791).

Biography 
Prior to his reign, he was the Grand Dragoman of the Ottoman Empire in Constantinople (1777–1782).

Reign 
Under his reign, police provisions taken concerned public hygiene such as chimney sweeping and the control of coffeehouses, inns, and ways. Unauthorized carrying of uniforms and weapons was prohibited, in order to avoid mutiny by those opposed to his taxation policy. Passports were introduced during his reign. both to control the entry of foreigners and the exit of the discontented.

Marriage and issue 
He was married to Tarisa Michalopoulos and had:

 Eufrosona Caradja; married Prince Dimitrius Ghica
 Zamfira Caradja; married Prince Alexander Mavrocordato
 Smaragda Caradja; married Prince Nicholas Mavrocordato (1744-1818)
 Maria Caradja; married Boyar Demetrius Manos, Postelnic of Wallachia
 Constantin Caradja; married Princess Ralu Mourouzi and had issue
 Alexandru Iorgu Caradja; married Marghioala Slatineanu and had issue
 Ioan Caradja (1770-1829), Dragoman of the Fleet 1799-1800; married Ecaterina Rodomani and had issue

Nicholas
Dragomans of the Porte
Romanian people of Greek descent
Rulers of Wallachia
1737 births
1784 deaths
18th-century translators